San Miguel Totolapan   is one of the 81 municipalities of Guerrero, in south-western Mexico. The municipal seat lies at San Miguel Totolapan.  The municipality covers an area of 2,648.1 km².

As of 2005, the municipality had a total population of 27,033.

References

Municipalities of Guerrero